Dario sp. 'Myanmar' is a small growing, attractively patterned fish, a relative of the more well-known Scarlet Badis found originating in Northern Myanmar (Burma) found in shallow, slow-moving waters.

Distribution 
Dario sp. 'Myanmar' is probably endemic to northern Myanmar and possibly to the state of Kachin, close to the city of Myitkyina. A pair of males from separate localities were included in the type series of D. hysginon (see ‘Notes’) with details given as ‘stream about 1.5 km on road Myitzon-Myitkyina’ and ‘ditch marginal to fish ponds about 40km N Myitkyina, on road to Myitzon’.

Habitat 
No details are available but the possibly sympatric Dario hysginon shows a marked preference for small, often murky pools with dense growths of aquatic plants or submerged grasses.

Diet 
Dario species are micropredators feeding on small aquatic crustaceans, worms, insect larvae and other zooplankton. In the aquarium hobby, it is advised to feed them a varied diet of Artemia nauplii, Daphnia, grindal, microworms, and banana worm.

Breeding 
Dario sp. 'Myanmar' is a substrate spawner forming temporary pair bonds.

References

Freshwater fish of Asia
Fauna of Myanmar
Undescribed vertebrate species
Badidae